This is a list of the rivers of Samoa.  
They are listed by island in alphabetical order.

Savai'i
Lata River
Maliolio River
Sili River

Upolu
Afulilo River
Fagataloa River
Falefa River
Falevai River
Fululasau River
Leafe River
Malata River
Mulivai River
Mulivaifagatola River
Namo River
Tafitoala River
Vailima River
Vaisigano River

References

 
Rivers
Samoa